Optical DownConverter (ODC) is an example of a non-linear optical process, in which  two beams of light of different frequencies  and  interact, creating microwave with frequency . It is a generalization of microwave. In the latter, both of which can be provided by a single light source. From a quantum mechanical perspective, ODC can be seen as result of differencing  two photons to produce a microwave. Since the energy of a photon is given by

the frequency summing  is simply a statement that energy is conserved.

In a common ODC application, light from a tunable infrared laser is combined with light from a fixed frequency visible laser to produce a microwave created by a wave mixing process.

The ODC use milimeteric microwave cavity that include photonic crystal that provide by two signal frequency light source. The microwave is detected by the cavity antenna.

See also
Sum-frequency generation
Homodyne detection

External links
Frequency Measurement
AdvR - Down conversion in KTiOPO4 (KTP)

Nonlinear optics